Philip Gröning (born 7 April 1959 in Düsseldorf) is a German director, documentary film maker and screenwriter.

Career 
Gröning was raised in Germany and US, but also traveled extensively. He studied Medicine and Psychology before beginning in the cinema with some acting. In 1986 he began doing his own films. His first documentary was The Last Picture Taken. 

In 2005 he gained acclaim for Into Great Silence. His 2013 film The Police Officer's Wife was screened in the main competition section at the 70th Venice International Film Festival and won the Special Jury Prize.

Philip Groening was the jury president of the Orrizonti section at the Venice international film festival in 2006, member of the main international jury at Venice international filmfestival 2014, member of the jury at the Filmfest Munich in 2009, and jury member at the Message of Man Festival in St Petersburg 2014. 

He has been lecturing at the Baden-Württemberg Film Academy since 2001 and is a professor at the International Film School in Cologne.

He is a member of the German Film Academy, the European Film Academy and the Bavarian Academy of the fine Arts.

Filmography

As actor 
 1984 : Nebel jagen
 1999 : Virtual Vampire
 2020 : Miss Marx

As director 
 1988 : Summer
 1992 : The Terrorist
 1998 : Philosophie
 2000 : L'Amour, l'argent, l'amour (translated to English as "Love, Money, Love")
 2005 : Into Great Silence
 2013 : The Police Officer's Wife
 2018 : My Brother's Name Is Robert and He Is an Idiot

Awards

 2005 Bayerischer Filmpreis (Bavarian Film Awards) Prize for Best Documentary for Into Great Silence.

 2013 Seville European Film Festival Best Actress for The Police Officer's Wife. 

 2014 Vilnius International Film Festival Best Actress for The Police Officer's Wife. 

 2018 Sitges Film Festival Best Director for My Brother's Name Is Robert and He Is an Idiot. 

 2018 Gent Explore Zone award for My Brother's Name Is Robert and He Is an Idiot.

References

External links 
 

1959 births
Living people
Film people from Düsseldorf
German documentary filmmakers
English-language film directors
European Film Awards winners (people)